The 2001 Open Telefónica by Nissan was contested over 8 race weekends/16 rounds. In this one-make formula all drivers had to use Coloni chassis (Coloni CN1) and Nissan engines (Nissan 2L). 12 different teams and 33 different drivers competed.

Teams and Drivers

Race calendar

Final points standings

For every race the points were awarded: 20 points to the winner, 15 for runner-up, 12 for third place, 10 for fourth place, 8 for fifth place, 6 for sixth place, 4 for seventh place, winding down to 1 point for 10th place. Lower placed drivers did not award points. Additional points were awarded to the driver setting the fastest race lap (2 points). The best 11 race results count, but all additional points count.

Drivers 

 Points System:

Teams 
 Points System:

External links

Renault Sport Series seasons
Open Telefonica by Nissan
Open Telefonica by Nissan
Open Telefonica by Nissan